No. 121 Squadron was a Royal Air Force (RAF) aircraft squadron that during the Second World War was one of the three Eagle Squadrons manned by American volunteers. There is a Royal Air Force Air Cadets squadron, based in Nuneaton, which shares its number.

First World War
No. 121 Squadron Royal Flying Corps (Royal Air Force from 1 April 1918) was formed at Narborough on 1 January 1918 as a day bomber squadron to operate the Airco DH.9. The squadron was equipped with Airco DH.4s for training, but due to delays with the DH.9 and the end of the war approaching, the squadron was disbanded on 17 August 1918 without becoming operational.

Second World War

RAF Service

The squadron was reformed on 14 May 1941 as No. 121 (Eagle) Squadron at RAF Kirton-in-Lindsey, the second of three Eagle Squadrons manned by American volunteers. Equipped with the Hawker Hurricane, the squadron then converted to the Supermarine Spitfire and moved south to RAF North Weald to begin operations on channel sweeps and Rhubarb operations. On 15 November 1941 the squadron claimed its first enemy aircraft destroyed. The squadron then upgraded to cannon-armed Spitfire VBs and carried out offensive operations over the channel and providing bomber escorts.

To the USAAF
In September 1942, the squadron moved to RAF Debden to be with the other Eagle squadrons. The squadron was transferred to the United States Army Air Forces as the 335th Fighter Squadron and officially disbanded as a RAF unit on 29 September 1942. The new squadron became part of the 4th Fighter Group of the Eighth Air Force.

Aircraft operated

See also
List of Royal Air Force aircraft squadrons
335th Fighter Squadron
Eagle Squadrons

References

Notes

Bibliography

 Caine, Philip D. American Pilots in the RAF: The WWII Eagle Squadrons. Brassey's, 1993. .
 Childers, James Saxon. War Eagles: The Story of the Eagle Squadron. Windmill Press, 1943.
Republished by Eagle Publishing in 1983, . Same as the 1943 edition, except it has an epilogue of the members in 1982.
 Donahue, Arthur Gerald. Tally-Ho! Yankee in a Spitfire. McMillan & Company, 1942.
 Dunn, William R. Fighter Pilot: The First American Ace of World War II. University of Kentucky Press, 1982. .
 Franks, Norman. The Greatest Air Battle: Dieppe, 19 August 1942. London: Grub Street, 1992. .
 Fydenchuk, W. Peter. Immigrants of War: Americans Serving With the RAF and RCAF During World War II. WPF Publications, 2005. .
 Goodson, James A. and Norman Franks. Over-Paid, Over-Sexed and Over-Here. Wingham Press Ltd., 1991. .
 Halley, James J. The Squadrons of the Royal Air Force & Commonwealth, 1918-1988. Tonbridge, Kent, UK: Air-Britain (Historians) Ltd., 1988. .
 Haughland, Vern. Caged Eagles: Downed American Fighter Pilots, 1940-45. TAB Books, 1992. .
 Haughland, Vern. The Eagle Squadrons: Yanks in the RAF, 1940-1942. Ziff-Davis Flying Books, 1979.
Republished by TAB Books in 1992, with all the photos different from the 1st edition.
 Haughland, Vern. The Eagles' War: The Saga of the Eagle Squadron Pilots, 1940-1945. Jason Aronson, Inc., 1982. .
Republished by TAB Books in 1992, with all the photos different from the 1st edition.
 Holmes, Tony. American Eagles: American Volunteers in the R.A.F., 1937-1943. Classic Publications, 2001. .
 Jefford, C.G. RAF Squadrons, a Comprehensive Record of the Movement and Equipment of all RAF Squadrons and their Antecedents since 1912. Shrewsbury: Airlife Publishing, 2001. .
 Kershaw, Alex. The Few. Da Capo Press, 2006. .
 Morris, John T. The Lives of an American Eagle. Mulberry River Press, 1999. .
 Nelson, Kenneth James, CD. Spitfire RCW: The Wartime Exploits of Wing Commander Royce Clifford Wilkinson OBE, DFM & Bar, C.de G.(France). Hignall Printing Ltd., 1994.
 Rawlings, John D.R. Fighter Squadrons of the RAF and their Aircraft. London: Macdonald and Jane's (Publishers) Ltd., 1969 (new edition 1976, reprinted 1978). .
 Sweeny, Charles and Colonel James A. Goodson. Sweeny: The autobiography of Charles Sweeny. Harrop Press Ltd., 1990. .

External links

 No 121 - 125 Squadron Histories
 RAF Eagle Squadron (historic video)
  4th Fighter Group WWII Official WWII Association Website

Military units and formations established in 1918
121 Squadron
121 Squadron
1918 establishments in the United Kingdom
Eagle Squadrons